Geordan Edward Andrew Murphy (born 19 April 1978) is an Irish rugby union coach and former player. He played as fullback or wing both for the Irish international team and the English club Leicester Tigers.

Youth
Murphy was born in Dublin, Ireland. He was officially named George after his father but his mother called him Geordan to avoid confusion. His six brothers and sister all played rugby union. Murphy was educated at Newbridge College, Newbridge, Co. Kildare before attending Waterford Institute of Technology and De Montfort University in Leicester.

Murphy played Gaelic football at Minor (U18) level with Kildare GAA in the All-Ireland Minor Football Championship.

Playing career
In 1997 shortly before he joined Leicester Tigers, Murphy gained his first U18 rugby cap for Ireland. He gradually made his way into the Tigers' first team squad, while gaining caps for Ireland U21. Opportunities at fullback were limited by the presence of Tim Stimpson, but he gained a place on the right wing. Murphy started in both of Leicester's back-to-back Heineken Cup final wins in 2001 and 2002, scoring a try in the latter final. He also helped Leicester win four Premiership trophies in a row in 1999, 2000, 2001 and 2002.

Murphy broke his leg in Ireland's last warm-up game against Scotland at Murrayfield prior to the 2003 Rugby Union World Cup and did not compete.

Murphy won his fifth Premiership medal in 2007, starting the final as Leicester defeated Gloucester.

As he matured, Murphy preferred full back over wing.  His main rivals for the Ireland full back starting position were Girvan Dempsey and Rob Kearney. In his autobiography he stated that he had a poor working relationship with former Ireland Coach Eddie O'Sullivan mainly because he played for an English team. Murphy was named as the starting full back for Ireland in the crucial game against Argentina on 22 November 2008, and scored one of Ireland's two tries in that game.

He was a member of the victorious Ireland team that won the 2009 Six Nations Championship and Grand Slam. In May 2009, Murphy was named in the Barbarians squad to play England and Australia along with Ireland teammate Gordon D'Arcy.

He took over the Tiger's Captaincy on the field in the 2008/9 season, when club captain Martin Corry was not in the team, and led them to two finals that season – Heineken Cup and English Premiership, the latter of which they won. The following season, he was named official club captain, though missed out on much of the season due to injury. He returned in February, to lead the team to a successive Guinness Premiership title, when the Tigers beat Saracens 33–27 in the final.

On 11 September Murphy was picked to start in the first match of the 2011 rugby world cup since Rob Kearney was injured. Ireland won the game 22–10 against the United States. He came on then to replace Keith Earls in the Russia game.

In May 2012, Murphy announced his retirement from playing international Rugby, and in May 2013, he announced his retirement from playing all forms of rugby. Murphy was left out of the squad for the 2013 Premiership final shortly before he retired.

Coaching
In May 2013 Murphy was declared to become assistant coach at Leicester from the 2013–14 season onwards. He masterminded Tigers winning of the 2016–17 Anglo-Welsh Cup, the first Tigers trophy won in the period Murphy was part of the coaching team.

He acted as head coach for the September 2017 Leicester game vs Bath, when new head coach Matt O'Connor had only just arrived.

Murphy was placed in formal interim charge of Leicester Tigers on 3 September 2018 following the sacking of O'Connor. This position was made permanent in December 2018.

He was promoted to director of rugby on 1 July 2020 with the appointment of Steve Borthwick as head coach.

His contract was terminated ahead of the 2020–21 season.

References

External links
Leicester profile
IRFU profile
B&I Lions profile

My sport:Geordan Murphy – The Telegraph

1978 births
Living people
Alumni of De Montfort University
Barbarian F.C. players
British & Irish Lions rugby union players from Ireland
Gaelic footballers who switched code
Ireland international rugby union players
Irish rugby union coaches
Irish rugby union players
Kildare Gaelic footballers
Leicester Tigers players
Rugby union wings
Rugby union fullbacks
Rugby union players from Dublin (city)
People educated at Newbridge College
Alumni of Waterford Institute of Technology
Leicester Tigers coaches
Ireland Wolfhounds international rugby union players
Irish expatriate sportspeople in England
Expatriate rugby union players in England
Irish expatriate rugby union players